Scott Stover is a philanthropy advisor specializing in arts and culture. He is known for his progressive venture philanthropy model and providing strategic planning and implementation services to cultural institutions, private art collectors, artists, foundations, and government and civic agencies. Most notably, Stover revived the Centre Pompidou Foundation in 2005. He is an art collector and a leading figure in international cultural conversation and arts media. Stover holds dual U.S. and French citizenship and has offices in Los Angeles and France.

Career

Stover received his A.B. and M.B.A. from Columbia University in New York and did further graduate studies in semiology and art history at Ecole Pratique des Hautes-Etudes in Paris. Stover “pursu[ed] a highly successful career as an investment banker” and beginning in 1990, was at the forefront of adapting special situations in continental Europe for investors in the U.S. and internationally.

In 2005, Stover founded Global Art Development, now Scott Stover Inc, a philanthropy advisory firm based in Los Angeles. The firm's approach to strategic planning is anchored in finance to develop sustainable non-profit and for-profit projects designed for long-term impact. Stover has led projects internationally and his clients include cultural institutions and private foundations, government organizations and civic agencies, private collectors and families, artists, and artist foundations. Stover has launched and managed several private foundations, including Centre Pompidou Foundation, Shulamit Nazarian Foundation and Cahiers d’Art Institute. In addition to establishing the financial and legal framework of private foundations, he manages the structuring of operations, board building, programming, and marketing, branding, and communications.  

Stover advocates for a progressive venture philanthropy model that favors the sustainable philanthropy priorities of the millennial generation. This approach departs from traditional forms of venture capital finance and favors impact-driven projects focused on achieving economic sustainability and philanthropic goals. Stover is regularly involved in public discussions about the future of arts and culture and his ideas have been quoted in Le Figaro, Financial Times, The New York Times, Los Angeles Times, The Art Newspaper, Sotheby's Magazine, and HuffPost.

Centre Pompidou 
In 2005, Stover was commissioned to revive Centre Pompidou Foundation, an American foundation dedicated to supporting the Centre Pompidou in Paris. The Foundation's website states that its "mission is to raise funds to enable acquisitions, exhibitions, and conservation, and to encourage donating and loaning works of art to enhance the collection of the Centre Pompidou."

Before Stover was named Founding Executive Director, the Foundation had been inactive for over 10 years since the death of its original founder, Dominique de Menil. Stover successfully revived the Foundation, developing and implementing a strategic plan that generated cash grants, contributions and major gifts of art and design—including works by Robert Gober, Philip Guston, Hannah Wilke, David Smith and Sherrie Levine. He also recruited the Foundation's first chair, Robert M. Rubin, whose donation of Jean Prouve's seminal Tropical House was the first major gift to the Foundation. Now known as the American Friends of the Centre Pompidou, the Foundation is considered a model in sustainable, cross-border philanthropy. Stover managed and oversaw all of the Foundation's strategy and operations as executive director until 2013.

Cahiers d'Art Institute 
As the current executive director of Cahiers d’Art Institute, Stover is spearheading a project to build and maintain a digital platform for catalogues raisonnés. Central to the project, digital catalogues raisonnés will be "anchored" to the Blockchain—for the first time—and available to art professionals.

Shulamit Nazarian Foundation 
Between 2015 and 2017, Stover created a grant making U.S. non-profit for gallerist and philanthropist Shulamit Nazarian with a focus on Middle Eastern artists and projects. He also negotiated the Foundation's first major grant program, the creation of Dunya Contemporary Art Prize at the Museum of Contemporary Art, Chicago.

Recognition and Awards 

In 2013, Stover was named Chevalier de l’Ordre des Arts et des Lettres for his contribution to French arts and culture. He has served as a member of the Fine Art Commission of the City of Beverly Hills and on the advisory board of BASMOCA, the Basma Al Sulaiman Museum of Contemporary Art. Stover has been a panelist for major international talks and conferences, and art fair events discussing the future of philanthropy and the arts. He has an award-winning garden in Provence, France.

References

Living people
American nonprofit executives
American philanthropists
American art collectors
American investment bankers
Year of birth missing (living people)